Sadique Mohammed (born 1 August 1938) is a former West Indian cricket umpire. He stood in three Test matches between 1981 and 1986 and seven ODI games between 1981 and 1986.

See also
 List of Test cricket umpires
 List of One Day International cricket umpires

References

1938 births
Living people
West Indian Test cricket umpires
West Indian One Day International cricket umpires